Kenneth Henry Clements (born 9 April 1955 in Middleton, Lancashire) is an English former footballer who played as a defender in the Football League for Manchester City, in two spells, between 1971 and 1979 and between 1985 and 1988, Oldham Athletic, Bury and Shrewsbury Town, and was briefly player-manager of League of Ireland club Limerick. He made 282 appearances for Manchester City in all competitions, scoring twice. He was an unused substitute when Manchester City won the 1976 Football League Cup Final.

After retiring from football, Clements opened a driving school in the Oldham area, and resumed his interest in painting. He now works as a chauffeur for Manchester property tycoon Aneel Mussarat at MCR Property Ltd in Rusholme, Manchester, UK.

References

External links
 
 Stats and photo at Sporting Heroes

1955 births
Living people
People from Middleton, Greater Manchester
English footballers
Association football defenders
Manchester City F.C. players
Oldham Athletic A.F.C. players
Bury F.C. players
Limerick F.C. players
Shrewsbury Town F.C. players
English Football League players
League of Ireland players
English football managers
Limerick F.C. managers
League of Ireland managers